William Eric Evankovich (born April 6, 1972) is an American singer/songwriter, guitarist and producer, best known for his performances with the Guess Who and rock duo Shaw Blades, his co-production of Tommy Shaw's 2011 debut bluegrass album The Great Divide and for producing and co-writing Styx's sixteenth studio album, The Mission. and seventeenth studio album, Crash Of The Crown. Will also produced and played on the 2018 The Guess Who album, "The Future Is What It Used To Be," with Derek Sharp, when they were both in TGW. In 2021 he began touring as the seventh member of Styx.

Career 
Evankovich is currently working as a songwriter, producer and performer.  Over the past decade, he has performed with artists including Tommy Shaw of Styx, Jack Blades of Night Ranger, Styx, Night Ranger, Shaw Blades, Don Felder, Robin Zander, Dwight Yoakam, Johnny Lee, Mac Powell of Third Day, Bun E Carlos, Vince Neil, Ted Nugent, Jeff Carlisi of 38 Special and Tommy Thayer of Kiss.  He started Mason Lane, Stereo Flyers, and was a co-founder, lead vocalist and guitar player for the American rock band The American Drag.

In 2004 he formed The American Drag with guitarist Monroe Grisman, and bassist Joe Shaughnessy and they released their debut album American Drag in 2005.

From 2007 to 2009, he toured with Jack Blades and Tommy Shaw in their Shaw/Blades project. He was asked by Jack Blades, who had seen American Drag perform and wanted Evankovich to join them on acoustic, 12-string, harmonica and background vocals.

In 2009, The American Drag released their second album, Out of the Sky, with drummer John Mader and Eric Levy(Garaj Mahal). Jack Blades provided the circa World War I aviation photos taken by Blades's grandfather for the CD cover. The American Drag was invited to open two shows for Styx, one at the House of Blues in Los Angeles and another at the Mountain Winery in Saratoga.

In 2009, Evankovich made his musical theater debut as a guitar player in the opening of the stage musical American Idiot at the Berkeley Repertory Theatre, a show which would move to Broadway in 2010. The show was the top grossing show in Berkeley Rep history.

In 2014, Evankovich joined the band the Guess Who on lead guitar and toured with them until 2021.

In 2017, Evankovich produced and co-wrote the Styx album The Mission.

In 2021, Evankovich produced and co-wrote the Styx album Crash Of The Crown and was officially announced as the seventh member of Styx by Tommy Shaw.

Discography

References

External links 
 Will Evankovich official website

American male singer-songwriters
American rock songwriters
American rock singers
Living people
1972 births
Musicians from Santa Rosa, California
Singer-songwriters from California
21st-century American singers
21st-century American male singers